Joan Monterde Raygal (born 18 December 1997) is a Spanish professional footballer who plays as a right winger for Lleida Esportiu.

Club career
Born in Sagunto, Valencian Community, Monterde joined Levante UD's youth setup in 2011, from Villarreal CF. On 31 August 2016, after finishing his formation, he was loaned to Segunda División B side CD Izarra for the season, and made his senior debut on 25 September of that year by playing the last 20 minutes in a 0–2 away loss against Pontevedra CF.

Upon returning to the Granotas, Monterde was assigned to the reserves in Tercera División. On 9 January 2018, he renewed his contract until 2020, and scored his first senior goal five days later, netting his team's first in a 2–2 draw at Elche CF Ilicitano.

On 19 May 2020, Monterde extended his contract with Levante until 2021. He made his first team – and La Liga – debut on 19 July, coming on as a late substitute for Gonzalo Melero in a 1–0 home defeat of Getafe CF.

References

External links

1997 births
Living people
People from Sagunto
Sportspeople from the Province of Valencia
Spanish footballers
Footballers from the Valencian Community
Association football wingers
La Liga players
Segunda División B players
Tercera División players
CD Izarra footballers
Atlético Levante UD players
Levante UD footballers